Thong Auan 'Noi' Tucker (1 December 1960-) is a former Australian international lawn and indoor bowler.

She won a silver medal in the triples with Ceri Ann Davies and Roma Dunn at the 2006 Commonwealth Games in Melbourne. 

Born in Thailand she now lives in Jindalee, Western Australia and won her first Australian cap in 2006. She announced her international retirement in 2007.

References

Living people
1960 births
Bowls players at the 2006 Commonwealth Games
Australian female bowls players
Commonwealth Games medallists in lawn bowls
Thai emigrants to Australia
Commonwealth Games silver medallists for Australia
Medallists at the 2006 Commonwealth Games